Woodford's rail (Hypotaenidia woodfordi) is a species of bird in the family Rallidae.

Distribution and habitat
It is endemic to the Solomon Islands archipelago.  Its natural habitats are subtropical or tropical moist lowland forest, subtropical or tropical swamps, rivers, freshwater lakes, freshwater marshes, and rural gardens.

Status and conservation
It is currently threatened by habitat loss and is the only surviving species of the genus Nesoclopeus. However, recent genetic evidence finds that the species is nested within Hypotaenidia, as sister taxon to the Guam rail.

References

Woodford's rail
Birds of the Solomon Islands
Woodford's rail
Taxonomy articles created by Polbot